Wilson Street is a thoroughfare in Glasgow, the largest city in Scotland. The street runs east from Virginia Street through the Merchant City until it meets Candleriggs.

History

The street was opened in 1790 and was, along with Brunswick Street, John Street and Hutcheson Street, part of Glasgow's second 'new town'.

It was named after George Wilson, a Glasgow merchant, who founded Wilson's School, to the north of the Trongate. Wilson died in London in 1778.

References

Streets in Glasgow
History of Glasgow